Muhamad Guntur Triaji (born 30 July 1993) is an Indonesian professional footballer who plays as a midfielder for Liga 1 club Persikabo 1973.

Club career

PS TNI
Guntur was selected to represent Indonesia in 2011 through a national and regional selection process in September and October 2010. He joined TNI for the 2016 Indonesia Soccer Championship A. In the seventh week, Guntur made his first goal against Persipura Jayapura.

Persela Lamongan
He was signed for Persela Lamongan to play in Liga 1 in the 2018 season. Guntur made his debut on 24 March 2018 in a match against Persipura Jayapura. On 16 April 2018, Triaji scored his first goal for Persela against Bali United in the 38th minute at the Surajaya Stadium, Lamongan.

TIRA-Persikabo/Persikabo 1973
In 2019, Guntur Triaji signed a contract with Indonesian Liga 1 club TIRA-Persikabo. He made his league debut on 18 May 2019 in a match against Badak Lampung at the Pakansari Stadium, Cibinong.

PSIS Semarang (loan)
Guntur was loaned for PSIS Semarang to play in Liga 1 in the 2022–23 season. On 30 July 2022, Guntur made his league debut for the club in a 1–2 lose over Arema at Kanjuruhan Stadium.

Personal life
On 20 November 2022, Guntur married his girlfriend, Della Adisty Handayani, Della Adisty is an Indonesian archery athlete. She has participated in various world championships, she is also the son of the best female archer in Indonesia, Lilies Handayani. Guntur officially married her in a wedding ceremony held in Surabaya, East Java.

References

External links
 

1993 births
Living people
Sportspeople from Lampung
Indonesian footballers
Persiraja Banda Aceh players
Persija Jakarta players
Persikabo 1973 players
Persela Lamongan players
PSIS Semarang players
Indonesian Premier Division players
Liga 1 (Indonesia) players
Association football midfielders